The Autrigones were a pre-Roman tribe that settled in the north of the Iberian Peninsula, in what today is the western Basque Country (western regions of Biscay and Álava) and northern Burgos and the East of Cantabria, Spain. Their territory limited with the Cantabri territory at west, the Caristii at east, the Berones at the southeast and the Turmodigi at the south. It is discussed whether the Autrigones were Celts, theory supported by the existence of toponyms of Celtic origin, such as Uxama Barca and other with -briga endings and that eventually underwent a Basquisation along with other neighboring tribes such as the Caristii and Varduli.

Location
Roman historians as Pomponius Mela and Pliny the Elder located them in the northern region of present-day province of Burgos. Pliny the Elder writes about the "ten states of the Autrigones" and says the only ones worth mentioning are Tritium Autrigonum (Monasterio de Rodilla, Burgos) and Virovesca (possibly the present-day Briviesca, Burgos; Celtiberian-type mint: Uirouiaz) in the valley of Oca River.
The other Autrigones' towns were Deobriga (near Miranda de Ebro, Burgos), Uxama Barca (Osma de Valdegobia; Celtiberian-type mint: Uarcaz), Segisamunculum (Cerezo del Riotirón, Burgos), Antecuia (near Pancorbo, Burgos), Vindeleia (Cubo de Bureba, Burgos), Salionca (Poza de la Sal, Burgos) and the port of Portus Amanus/Flaviobriga (Castro Urdiales, Cantabria).

Origins 

The Autrigones are mentioned for the first time on a document by Roman historian Livy in 76 BC, describing the actions of Quintus Sertorius in the Iberian Peninsula. Strabo mentions them in his book Geographica, naming them allótrigones, a word adapted from Greek meaning "strange people".

Based on the study of their toponyms - as also happens with the Caristii and Varduli - it is likely they were a Celtic tribe who eventually suffered a process of Basquisation. The known toponyms of the Autrigones are of Celtic origin, as Uxama Barca in present-day Álava, and many others ending in -briga.  The toponyms of rivers, as the Nervión, the anthroponyms, the archeological remains, tools and weapons relate them culturally with the Celts, but with a clear differentiation of other close Celtic tribes, as the Celtiberians.

Culture 
The Autrigones were culturally related to the early Iron Age "Monte Bernorio-Miraveche" cultural group of northern Burgos and Palencia provinces. Additional archeological evidence indicates that by the 2nd Iron Age they came under the influence of the Celtiberians. 
By the 1st century BC they were organized into a federation of autonomous mountain-top fortified towns (Civitates) on the mountain ranges of the upper Ebro, protected by stout adobe walls of the "Numantine" type.

More archeological evidence have been found, emphasizing their celtiberian culture, such as the hospitality tesserae. These consisted on a zoomorphic-shaped metal tablet with an inscription using a variant of the Northeastern Iberian script (also known as Celtiberian script), written in a form of celtiberian language.

History
Around the beginning of the 4th century BC the Autrigones migrated to the Peninsula and overrun the entire area corresponding today to the modern provinces of Cantabria and Burgos, which eventually became known as Autrigonia or Austrigonia.  By the mid-4th century BC the Autrigones reached the Pisuerga valley where they established their capital Autraca or Austraca, located at the banks of the river Autra (Odra).  They also gained an outlet to the sea by seizing from the Aquitanian-speaking Caristii further east the coastal highland region between the rivers Asón and Neroua (Nervión), in the modern eastern Cantabria, Vizcaya, and Álava Basque provinces.  However, the Autrigones’ hold to this vast territory was not meant to last; some time after 300 BC they were driven out from southern Autrigonia – the western Burgos region – by the Turmodigi allied with the Vaccei, who seized the Autrigones’ early capital Autraca.  Thrust back to their lands on the mountain ranges of the upper Ebro north of the Arlanzón valley around the 3rd-2nd Centuries BC, the Autrigones allied themselves with the Berones and evolved into a tribal society similar to the peoples of the north-west.  By the 1st century BC, they were organized into a federation of ten autonomous mountain-top fortified towns (Civitates), chiefly among them their new capital Virovesca in the Oca river valley.

Romanization 

They seem to have taken no part in the Celtiberian Wars though as traditional allies of the Berones helped the latter in fighting off the Roman general Sertorius' incursion into northern Celtiberia in 76 BC, and remained independent until the late 1st century BC, when the mounting pressure of Astures and Cantabri raids finally forced them to seek an alliance with Rome.
Despite being aggregated in the new Hispania Tarraconensis province at the early 1st century AD, the Autrigones were only partially romanized, never became Christian and continued to provide the Roman Imperial army with auxiliary troops (Auxilia) up to the late Empire.

The early Middle Ages
The Autrigone people survived the overthrow of the Roman Empire in Spain by the Germanic invasions of the late 4th century and briefly recreated their realm in parts of the current provinces of Burgos, Álava, and Biscay which lasted for nearly two centuries, before being conquered by their Varduli neighbours and ultimately destroyed or absorbed by the Vascones in around AD 580.

See also
 Celtiberian script
 Cantabrian Wars
 Caristii
 Sertorian Wars
 Varduli
 Origin of the Basques
 Pre-Roman peoples of the Iberian Peninsula

References

Bibliography

 Ángel Montenegro et alii, Historia de España 2 - colonizaciones y formación de los pueblos prerromanos (1200-218 a.C), Editorial Gredos, Madrid (1989) 
 Francisco Burillo Mozota, Los Celtíberos, etnias y estados, Crítica, Grijalbo Mondadori, S.A., Barcelona (1998, revised edition 2007)

Further reading

Daniel Varga, The Roman Wars in Spain: The Military Confrontation with Guerrilla Warfare, Pen & Sword Military, Barnsley (2015) 
Philip Matyszak, Sertorius and the struggle for Spain, Pen & Sword Military, Barnsley (2013) 
Ludwig Heinrich Dyck, The Roman Barbarian Wars: The Era of Roman Conquest, Author Solutions (2011) ISBNs 1426981821, 9781426981821

External links
http://www.celtiberia.net
http://www.montebernorio.com

Pre-Roman peoples of the Iberian Peninsula
Celtic tribes of the Iberian Peninsula
Ancient peoples of Spain
Basque history